Peter Donohoe may refer to:

 Peter Donohoe (bobsleigh) (born 1964), Irish Olympic bobsledder
 Peter Donohoe (Gaelic footballer) (died 2004), former Gaelic football player for Cavan
 Peter Donohoe (pianist) (born 1953), English pianist

See also
 Peter Donahue (disambiguation)